Roje  is a village in the Gmina Miłakowo, Ostróda County, Warmian-Masurian Voivodeship, in northern Poland.  

References

Roje